Himley was a station on the Wombourne Branch Line. Unlike other stops along the route, it was deemed worthy of full station status. It was opened by the Great Western Railway in 1925 and closed in 1932. It served the community around Himley Hall.

A picnic area now stands on the site of the station. It is also part of the South Staffordshire Railway Walk but is the final stretch of track still in situ as after the site is a landfill site.

References

Further reading

Disused railway stations in Staffordshire
South Staffordshire District
Former Great Western Railway stations
Railway stations in Great Britain opened in 1925
Railway stations in Great Britain closed in 1932